Megyer is a historical Hungarian language term which has different meanings in the Hungarian language. Most of it are connected with the names of geographical regions in Hungary. E.g. Megyer is a village in Veszprém county, Káposztásmegyer and Békásmegyer are areas of the northern part of the capital Budapest.

External links 
 Street map (Hungarian)
 

Populated places in Veszprém County